Jayce Josefina Andrade Andrade (born ) is a Venezuelan volleyball player. She was part of the Venezuela women's national volleyball team. She competed with the national team at the 2008 Summer Olympics in Beijing,  China. She played with Zulia in 2008.

Clubs
  Zulia (2008)

See also
 Venezuela at the 2008 Summer Olympics

References

External links
Jayce Andrade at Sports Reference
 http://www.scoresway.com/zgorzelec?sport=volleyball&page=player&id=5116
 2008 Official Results Part Two: Hockey – Wrestling, LA84 Foundation.
http://www.gettyimages.com/photos/jayce-andrade-andrade?excludenudity=true&sort=mostpopular&mediatype=photography&phrase=jayce%20andrade%20andrade
http://www.telegraph.co.uk/sport/olympics/2579481/Volleyball-Venezuela-learn-from-Cuba-and-Che-Guevara-Olympics.html
http://www.todor66.com/volleyball/Central_America/Women_CAG_2002.html

1984 births
Living people
Venezuelan women's volleyball players
Place of birth missing (living people)
Volleyball players at the 2008 Summer Olympics
Olympic volleyball players of Venezuela